Kosmos 498 ( meaning Cosmos 498), known before launch as DS-P1-Yu No.56, was a Soviet satellite which was launched in 1972 as part of the Dnepropetrovsk Sputnik programme. It was a  spacecraft, which was built by the Yuzhnoye Design Bureau, and was used as a radar calibration target for anti-ballistic missile tests.

Kosmos 498 was successfully launched into low Earth orbit at 09:29:58 UTC on 5 July 1972. The launch took place from Site 133/1 at the Plesetsk Cosmodrome, and used a Kosmos-2I 63SM carrier rocket. Upon reaching orbit, the satellite was assigned its Kosmos designation, and received the International Designator 1972-050A. The North American Aerospace Defense Command assigned it the catalogue number 06086.

Kosmos 498 was the fifty-fifth of seventy nine DS-P1-Yu satellites to be launched, and the forty-ninth of seventy two to successfully reach orbit. It remained in orbit until it decayed and reentered the atmosphere on 25 November 1972.

See also

1972 in spaceflight

References

1972 in spaceflight
Kosmos satellites
Spacecraft launched in 1972
Dnepropetrovsk Sputnik program